Michael Castro (1945–2018) was a poet and translator. In 2015 Castro was named the first Poet Laureate of St. Louis. He was a founder of the literary journal River Styx.

Early life
Castro was born in 1945 in New York to Greek Jewish parents before moving to St. Louis to attend Washington University.

Career
Castro established the journal River Styx in 1975. He worked with Gabor G. Gyukics in translating poems from Hungarian to English. Castro taught at University of Missouri–St. Louis, and then Lindenwood University until his retirement to professor emeritus in 2012. In 2015, he was appointed the Poet Laureate of St. Louis. As part of his laureateship, he organized an art collective, Unity Community.

References

External links
 STL aldermen appoint Michael Castro city's first poet laureate, St. Louis Post-Dispatch, December 12, 2014.
 Poet Laureate Nominee Michael Castro Says Words Can Help Heal St. Louis, St. Louis Public Radio, December 10, 2014.

20th-century American poets
21st-century American poets
Poets from New York (state)
American people of Greek-Jewish descent
Jewish American poets
2018 deaths
1945 births
21st-century American Jews